Nanon (minor planet designation: 559 Nanon) is a minor planet orbiting the Sun. At the time of its discovery, Max Wolf was habitually naming asteroids after operatic heroines, suggesting is it most likely named after the lead character of Nanon, an 1877 opera by Richard Genée.

References

External links 
 
 

000559
Discoveries by Max Wolf
Named minor planets
000559
000559
19050308